Inyo County Airport is a closed airport located east of Fresno, California.

History 
During World War II, the airport was used by the United States Army Air Forces as an auxiliary training airfield for the flying school at Lone Pine Airport, California.

It was later used as a civil airport.    The facility closed sometime in the 1950s.    The remains of the runways and ground facilities can be seen in aerial imagery.

See also

 California World War II Army Airfields

References

External links 
  Abandoned & Little-Known Airfields: California: Inyo County

Airports in Inyo County, California
Airfields of the United States Army Air Forces in California